Lophocampa thyophora is a moth of the family Erebidae. It was described by William Schaus in 1896. It is found in Venezuela.

References
Notes

Sources
 Natural History Museum Lepidoptera generic names catalog

thyophora
Moths described in 1896